Dryopteris wallichiana, the alpine wood fern, is a robust species of deciduous or semi-evergreen fern in the family Dryopteridaceae, native to the Himalayas, Hawaii, Mexico and Jamaica.

The Latin specific epithet wallichiana refers to the 19th century Danish botanist Nathaniel Wallich.

A popular plant in cultivation, it has gained the Royal Horticultural Society's Award of Garden Merit.

References

wallichiana